Perlenbach is a river of Bavaria, Germany. It is the left headstream of the Schwesnitz in Rehau.

See also
List of rivers of Bavaria

References

Rivers of Bavaria
Rivers of Germany
Hof (district)